The Platinum Collection compiles all 9 singles that Glen Campbell released on Atlantic Records (1982 - 1986) plus 11 album tracks from two of his albums from that period: Old Home Town (1982) and Letter to Home (1984).

Track listing
 "Old Home Town" (David Pomeranz) - 3:43
 "I Love How You Love Me" (Mann, Kolber) - 2:35
 "On The Wings Of My Victory" (Corbin) - 3:36
 "Faithless Love" (J.D. Souther) - 3:16
 "A Lady Like You" (Weatherley, Stegall) - 3:34
 "(Love Always) Letter To Home" (Carl Jackson) - 2:58
 "It's Just A Matter Of Time" (Benton, Otis, Hendricks) - 2:28
 "Cowpoke" (Jones) - 2:46
 "Call Home" (Reid, Seals)  - 3:28
 "An American Trilogy" (Traditional, Arr. by Mickey Newberry) - 3:46
 "Goodnight Lady" (Nobles, Cannon)  - 4:09
 "After The Glitter Fades" (Stevie Nicks) - 2:46
 "Tennessee" (Michael Smotherman) - 3:04
 "Hang On Baby (Ease My Mind) " (Joe Rainey, Rogers) - 2:33
 "A Few Good Men" (Joe Rainey) - 3:10
 "I Was Too Busy Loving You" (Jimmy Webb) - 3:12
 "Ruth" (Jud Strunk) - 3:02
 "A Woman's Touch" (Jerry Fuller) - 3:16
 "Blues (My Naughty Sweetie Gives To Me) (Swanstrom, McCarron, Morgan) - 2:34
 "Mull of Kintyre" (Paul McCartney, Denny Laine) - 4:20

Production
Original recordings produced by Jerry Fuller, Harold Shedd
Compilation - Gary Wallington
Project Manager -Joe Arditti
Mastered at Heathmans Studio
Made in England for Warner Music UK Ltd.

2006 compilation albums
Glen Campbell compilation albums
Rhino Records compilation albums